SS Messenger may refer to one of two Type C2-S-B1 ships built for the United States Maritime Commission:

  (MC hull number 290), built by Moore Dry Dock in Oakland, California; later became USS Sheridan (AP-96/APA-51); scrapped in 1969 after explosion
  (MC hull number 2817), built by Consolidated Steel in Wilmington, California; scrapped in 1969

Ship names